Eunidia annulata is a species of beetle in the family Cerambycidae. It was described by Per Olof Christopher Aurivillius in 1924.

Subspecies
 Eunidia annulata annulata Aurivillius, 1924
 Eunidia annulata flavifrons Breuning, 1963

References

Eunidiini
Beetles described in 1924